The Greater Antilles is a grouping of the larger islands in the Caribbean Sea, including Cuba, Hispaniola, Puerto Rico, Jamaica, and the Cayman Islands. Six island states share the region of the Greater Antilles, with Haiti and the Dominican Republic sharing the island of Hispaniola. Together with the Lesser Antilles, they make up the Antilles. 

While most of the Greater Antilles consists of independent countries, Puerto Rico is an unincorporated territory of the United States, while the Cayman Islands are a British Overseas Territory. The largest island by area is Cuba, which extends to the western end of the island group. Puerto Rico lies on the eastern end, and the island of Hispaniola, the largest island by population, is located in the middle. Jamaica lies to the south of Cuba, while the Cayman Islands are located to the west. The state of Florida is the closest point in the U.S mainland to the Greater Antilles, while the Florida Keys, though not part of the Greater Antilles, is an island group north of Cuba.

History 
The word Antilles originated in the period before the European conquest of the New World. Europeans used the term Antillia as one of the mysterious lands featured on medieval charts, sometimes as an archipelago, sometimes as continuous land of greater or lesser extent, its location fluctuating mid-ocean between the Canary Islands and Eurasia. The first European contact with the Greater Antilles came from Christopher Columbus' first voyage to the Americas, as he sailed south from the Bahamas, exploring the northeast coast of Cuba and northern coast of Hispaniola. The Spanish began to create permanent settlements on Cuba and Hispaniola. The Atlantic slave trade brought many Africans to the islands. France began to exert influence over Haiti from 1625, dividing Hispaniola into two halves. Neighbouring Jamaica was invaded by the British, defeating the Spanish colonists.

At the beginning of the 16th century, the Spanish began to colonize the island of Puerto Rico. Despite the Laws of Burgos of 1512 and other decrees protecting indigenous populations, some Taíno Indians were forced into an encomienda system of forced labor in the early years of colonization.

The Haitian Revolution was the first and only successful anti-slavery and anti-colonial insurrection by self-liberated slaves; it established the independent nation of Haiti, the first in the Greater Antilles, the Caribbean, and Latin America as a whole. The next nation to achieve independence, the Dominican Republic, was also on Hispaniola, declaring independence from Spain in 1821. It was quickly absorbed by Haiti under the Unification of Hispaniola. 

The Dominican Republic regained independence in 1844 after the Dominican War of Independence. The rest of the Greater Antilles would remain under colonial rule for another hundred years. Along with the Philippines in Asia, Spain transferred possession of Cuba and Puerto Rico to the United States as a result of its loss in the Spanish-American War in 1898, coinciding with the Cuban War of Independence. This was the final loss of Spain's territorial possessions in the Americas. U.S. military rule over the island lasted until 1902, when Cuba was granted formal independence.

In 1917, the U.S. Congress passed the Jones–Shafroth Act (popularly known as the Jones Act), granting U.S. citizenship to Puerto Ricans born on or after April 25, 1898. In 1947, the U.S. Congress passed the Elective Governor Act, signed by President Truman, allowing Puerto Ricans to vote for their own governor. The Cuban Revolution in 1959 established Cuba as the only socialist state in the Greater Antilles. Jamaica was granted independence from the U.K in August 1962 becoming the last currently independent state in the Greater Antilles to achieve independence.

Geography 

The Greater Antilles comprises four major islands and numerous smaller ones. The island of Cuba is the largest island in the Greater Antilles, in Latin America, and in the Caribbean. It is followed by Hispaniola. Geologically, the Virgin Islands are also part of the Greater Antilles, though politically they are considered part of the Lesser Antilles. The remainder of the land belongs to the archipelago of the Lesser Antilles, which is a chain of islands to the east, running north–south and encompassing the eastern edge of the Caribbean Sea where it meets the Atlantic Ocean, as well as to the south, running east–west off the northern coast of South America.

The Lucayan Archipelago is not considered part of the Antilles archipelagos but rather of the North Atlantic.

Demographics 
The Greater Antilles is considered part of Latin America. With a population of 38 million, it makes up 6% of Latin America's total population. The capital of the Dominican Republic, Santo Domingo, with a population of over 2 million, is the largest city in the Greater Antilles. Other large cities include Havana, Port-au-Prince, and San Juan. The quality of life within the Greater Antilles is similar among Cuba, the Dominican Republic and Jamaica, whose Human Development Index categorizes them as "high human development". Cuba, the independent nation with the highest HDI, nevertheless ranks below Puerto Rico and the Cayman Islands, both of which are categorized as "very high". Haiti is an exception, having the lowest Human Development Index in the Greater Antilles and in all of the Americas at 0.498, which categorizes it as having "Low human development".

Languages 
Languages spoken in the Greater Antilles are mostly colonial languages, along with some Creole influence. Spanish is the main language in Cuba, the Dominican Republic and Puerto Rico. Haiti has a Creole language, Haitian Creole, as one of its official languages, alongside French. English is the main language in Jamaica and the Cayman Islands, though it is also an official language of Puerto Rico, where it is spoken as a second language. In Jamaica, a Creole language is spoken but carries no official recognition.

List of countries and dependencies

References

Further reading 
  254 pages.
 
 Rogozinski, Jan. A Brief History of the Caribbean. New York: Facts on File, 1992.

External links 
 

 
Archipelagoes of the Caribbean Sea
West Indies